Gregory Stephen "Mud" Paslawski (born August 25, 1961) is a Canadian former professional ice hockey right winger who played eleven seasons in the National Hockey League (NHL) for the Montreal Canadiens, St. Louis Blues, Winnipeg Jets, Buffalo Sabres, Quebec Nordiques, Philadelphia Flyers and Calgary Flames.

Paslawski was born in Kindersley, Saskatchewan to parents Sally and Walter Paslawski. He played junior hockey for the Prince Albert Raiders. Not drafted, Paslawski signed with the Montreal Canadiens in October 1981. He made his professional debut in the 1983–84 with Montreal. He was traded later that season to the St. Louis Blues.

Paslawski played in 650 games in his NHL career, scoring 187 goals and 185 assists for 372 points. As a member of the St. Louis Blues during the 1985–86 NHL season, he was a key contributor to the Blues' upset victory in game six of the Conference finals against Calgary, a game known as the Monday Night Miracle. His best season statistically was the 1986–87 season, when he scored 29 goals and 64 points, both career highs.

Career statistics

References

Bibliography

External links
 

1961 births
Living people
Buffalo Sabres players
Calgary Flames players
Canadian ice hockey forwards
Sportspeople from Kindersley
Montreal Canadiens players
Nova Scotia Voyageurs players
Peoria Rivermen (IHL) players
Philadelphia Flyers players
Prince Albert Raiders (SJHL) players
Quebec Nordiques players
St. Louis Blues players
St. Louis Vipers players
Undrafted National Hockey League players
Winnipeg Jets (1979–1996) players
Ice hockey people from Saskatchewan